The Seabiscuit Handicap is a Grade II American Thoroughbred horse race for three-years-old and older over a distance of one and one-sixteenth miles ( furlongs) on the turf track scheduled annually in late November at Del Mar Racetrack in Del Mar, California. The event currently carries a purse of $250,000.

History

The inaugural running of the event was on 17 July 1977 as the Citation Handicap at Hollywood Park Racetrack in Inglewood, California over a distance of  miles on the dirt track. The event was named after the eighth winner of the American Triple Crown in 1948, Citation. Citation had won the Hollywood Gold Cup at the Hollywood Park Racetrack in last victory of his career.

In 1979 for the third running of the event, American Graded Stakes Committee classified the event as Grade III.

In 1980 the event was run over a mile and was won by the Irish-bred Caro Bambino who equalled the course record set by Swaps in 1956. In 1991 the event was downgraded and moved to the Hollywood Park autumn meeting and run at a distance of  miles.

In 1983 the event was scheduled on the turf track over a distance of  miles and was split into two divisions. The event also was run in split divisions in 1991.

In 1984 the event was upgraded back to Grade III but due to the unexpected wet weather the race was run on the dirt track which was rated as sloppy. US Hall of Fame jockey Bill Shoemaker teamed up with US Hall of Fame trainer Charles E. Whittingham to easily win on the Argentine-bred Lord At War by three lengths in a slow time of 1:50.

In 1987 the event was upgraded once more to Grade II and once again Charles E. Whittingham would train an Argentine-bred Forlitano to victory. Forlitano would win again in 1988.

In 1999 the distance of the event was decrease to back to the original  miles. In 2004 the event was upgraded to the highest classification of Grade I.

The race was not run in 2005 due to problems with Hollywood Park's grass course not being ready after the turf course was reseeded.

The event was downgraded back to Grade II for the 2010 renewal.

With the closure of Hollywood Park Racetrack in 2013 the event was moved to Del Mar Racetrack. With the relocation of the event the Del Mar Administration renamed the event to the Seabiscuit Handicap in honor of the 1938 US Horse of the Year, Seabiscuit as set by Daily Racing Form and Turf & Sport Digest Awards.

Records
Speed  record:
 miles: 1:39.67 – Ashkal Way (2006)
 miles: 1:44.78 – Fastness (IRE) (1995)

Margins:
 lengths  – Al Mamoon (1986)

Most wins:
 2 - Forlitano (ARG) (1987, 1988)
 2 - Good Journey (2001, 2002)

Most wins by a jockey:
 4 - Garrett K. Gomez (1998, 2006, 2011, 2012)

Most wins by a trainer:
 4 - Charles E. Whittingham (1980, 1984, 1987, 1988)
 4 - Wallace Dollase (1994, 1998, 2001, 2002)

Most wins by an owner :
 3 - Evergreen Farm  (1987, 1988, 1995)

Winners

Legend:

 

Notes:

§ Ran as an entry

See also
List of American and Canadian Graded races

External links
 2021 Del Mar Media Guide

References

Horse races in California
Del Mar Racetrack
Graded stakes races in the United States
Grade 2 stakes races in the United States
Open mile category horse races
Turf races in the United States
1977 establishments in California
Recurring sporting events established in 1977